Datuk Amar Dunstan Endawie Enchana (25 July 1937 – 11 April 2014) was a Malaysian politician from Sarawak, former teacher and a member of the Iban people. He served as the Deputy Chief Minister of Sarawak from 1977 until 1979. Endawie also served as a member of the Sarawak State Legislative Assembly for the Krian constituency and the President of the now defunct Sarawak National Party (SNAP) during his political career. He was also a member of the several Sarawak state cabinets, including a tenure as state minister for Local Government.

Political career
Endawie began his career in Sarawak politics during the British colonial era. In 1963, he became a state cabinet minister under the first Chief Minister of Sarawak, Stephen Kalong Ningkan. Endawie became the President of the Sarawak National Party (SNAP) during the 1970s, a post he held until June 1980. Under Endawie leadership, SNAP became a member of the Barisan Nasional in 1976. Endawie also recruited several notable figures into SNAP, including Daniel Tajem, the former Vice-President of SNAP, whom Endawie persuaded to enter politics in 1968. Dunstan Endawie served as the Deputy Chief Minister of Sarawak from 1976 to 1979 under Chief Minister Abdul Rahman Ya'kub.

Diplomatic career
Endawie entered into the diplomatic field after retiring from active state politics. He was appointed as the High Commissioner of Malaysia to New Zealand. Endawie was the first ethnic Iban to become a Malaysian High Commissioner to another country.

Election results

Honours
  :
  Knight Commander of the Order of the Star of Sarawak (PNBS) - Dato' Sri
  Knight Commander of the Order of the Star of Hornbill Sarawak (DA) - Datuk Amar

Death
Dunstan Endawie died at approximately 4 a.m. at Saratok District Hospital on 11 April 2014, at the age of 76. Endawie, who was a resident of Letong Sawa, Saratok, was survived by his wife, Datin Amar Piling Endawie, and five children. His funeral was held on 18 April 2014, in Taman Indah in Saratok. He was buried at Saratok Memorial Hill cemetery in Bukit Perabun, Saratok.

See also
 Krian (state constituency)

References

External links
 The Borneo Insider: The passing of a dream: Dunstan Endawie

1937 births
2014 deaths
Deputy Chief Ministers of Sarawak
Members of the Sarawak State Legislative Assembly
Sarawak state ministers
High Commissioners of Malaysia to New Zealand
Sarawak National Party politicians
Iban people
20th-century Malaysian politicians
Malaysian diplomats
Knights Commander of the Most Exalted Order of the Star of Sarawak
Knights Commander of the Order of the Star of Hornbill Sarawak
People from Betong Division
People from Sarawak